Political repression in Imperial Japan lasted from the Meiji period to the fall of the Empire of Japan after the end of World War II. Throughout this period, dissidence was curtailed by laws, and police, and dissidents became political prisoners.

Several laws were passed to curtail dissidence in Imperial Japan, including the Public Peace Police Law in 1900, and the Peace Preservation Law in 1925.

The earliest secret police in Imperial Japan was the Danjodai, established in May 1869. The Tokubetsu Kōtō Keisatsu (Tokko) was established in 1911 following the Great Treason Incident of 1910.

See also
 Political prisoners in Imperial Japan
 Japanese dissidence during the Shōwa period
 Censorship in the Empire of Japan
 Tenkō
 Red Scare in Japan

References

Works Cited

Further reading

External links

 
Human rights abuses in Japan